Charles Comerford was an American football player.  He played at the end position for Yale University and was selected as a first-team All-American in 1916 by the International News Service and The Boston Post.  In 1919, Comerford joined the Yale coaching staff.  He continued to be an assistant coach at Yale at least through the 1922 season.

See also
1916 College Football All-America Team

References

Yale Bulldogs football players
Year of birth missing
Year of death missing